Hampea sphaerocarpa is a species of flowering plant in the family Malvaceae. It is found in Guatemala and Honduras. It is threatened by habitat loss.

References

sphaerocarpa
Flora of Guatemala
Flora of Honduras
Endangered flora of North America
Taxonomy articles created by Polbot